Andrey Misyuk (born 20 March 1981) is a retired Belarusian professional footballer.

External links

1981 births
Living people
Belarusian footballers
FC Neman Grodno players
FC Gomel players
FC Kommunalnik Slonim players
FC Darida Minsk Raion players
FC Belshina Bobruisk players
FC Partizan Minsk players
FC Gorodeya players
FC Isloch Minsk Raion players
Association football midfielders